Johannes Selle (born 13 January 1956) is a German politician of the Christian Democratic Union (CDU) who served as a member of the Bundestag from the state of Thuringia from 1994 to 1998 and again from 2009 to 2021.

Political career 
Selle became a member of the Bundestag in the 2009 German federal election. He was a member of the Committee on Culture and Media and the Committee on Economic Cooperation and Development.

Ahead of the 2021 elections, Selle failed to win his party's support for another candidacy in his district; he was succeeded by Mike Mohring as the CDU candidate for the election.

References

External links 

  
 Bundestag biography 

1956 births
Living people
Members of the Bundestag for Thuringia
Members of the Bundestag 2017–2021
Members of the Bundestag 2013–2017
Members of the Bundestag 2009–2013
Members of the Bundestag 1994–1998
Members of the Bundestag for the Christian Democratic Union of Germany